= 6/12 =

6/12 may refer to:

- June 12 (month-day date notation)
- December 6 (day-month date notation)
